Cornelis Johannes Geelhuijzen (4 February 1929 – 25 November 2020) was a Dutch footballer who played as a defender for Ajax.

Geelhuijzen later worked as a tailor, trained amateur club De Foresters, and celebrated his 60th wedding anniversary in 2018.

He died on 25 November 2020, aged 91.

Career statistics

Sources

References

1929 births
2020 deaths
Dutch footballers
AFC Ajax players
Association football defenders
Dutch tailors